Seyed Mohsen Mousavi is one of the four Iranian diplomats who disappeared in north Lebanon on 4 July 1982. His fate was never determined and he is presumed dead. It is speculated that they were captured by Lebanese Forces. In 2016, Iran accused Israel of being involved in his disappearance.

See also 
 Ahmad Motevaselian
 Kazem Akhavan 
 List of kidnappings
 List of people who disappeared
 Taghi Rastegar Moghadam

References

1980s missing person cases
1982 kidnapping of Iranian diplomats
Date of birth missing
Iranian diplomats
Missing people
Missing person cases in Lebanon